Mohan Estate is an elevated station on the Violet Line of the Delhi Metro. It is located between Sarita Vihar and Tughlakabad stations and close to the financial and industrial region of Mohan Estate in South Delhi.

History
The station finally received safety clearance and opened as part of Sarita Vihar–Badarpur section on 14 January 2011.

The station

Station layout

Facilities
The station also houses several ATMs, food kiosks and a book store run by WHSmith.
List of available ATM at Mohan Estate metro station are Canara Bank

Entry/Exit

See also

Delhi
Sarita Vihar
List of Delhi Metro stations
Transport in Delhi
Delhi Metro Rail Corporation
Delhi Suburban Railway
Delhi Monorail
Delhi Transport Corporation
South East Delhi
New Delhi
National Capital Region (India)
List of rapid transit systems
List of metro systems

References

External links

 Delhi Metro Rail Corporation Ltd. (Official site) 
 Delhi Metro Annual Reports
 
 UrbanRail.Net – Descriptions of all metro systems in the world, each with a schematic map showing all stations.

Delhi Metro stations
Railway stations opened in 2011
Railway stations in South Delhi district